Jaga may refer to:

Peoples
 Jaga (Rajasthan), a social caste of genealogists in Rajasthan, India
 Jaga (Muslim caste), a Muslim community in the state of Uttar Pradesh, India
 Jaga (Kongo), two bands of warriors encountered by the Portuguese in the African kingdom of Kongo

Fictional characters
 Jaga the Wise, a character from the American animated television series ThunderCats
 Jaga, several scorpion-like species in the Bionicle line of Lego toys
 Jaga, in the Japanese anime Beast King GoLion

Other uses
 Jaga (kingdom), a pre-colonial Central African state
 Jaga Jazzist, a Norwegian jazz/electronica/prog-crossover band
 Jagiellonia Bialystok, a Polish football team

See also
 Geronimo ji-Jaga (1947–2011), black panther
 Baba Yaga, a witch in Slavic mythology (alternate spelling Baby Jaga)
 Jagga (disambiguation)